2011 World Cup may refer to:
 2011 Cricket World Cup
 2011 Baseball World Cup
 2011 Rugby World Cup
 2011 IFAF World Cup - American Football
 2011 World Cup (snooker)
 2011 World Cup (men's golf)
 Chess World Cup 2011

Football (soccer)
 Women: 2011 FIFA Women's World Cup
 Youth: 2011 FIFA U-20 World Cup
 Junior: 2011 FIFA U-17 World Cup
 Club: 2011 FIFA Club World Cup
 Beach soccer: 2011 FIFA Beach Soccer World Cup